Irmentraud Ruckser (13 February 1925 – 23 April 2018) was an Austrian gymnast who competed in the 1948 Summer Olympics. She died in Vienna in April 2018 at the age of 93.

References

1925 births
2018 deaths
Austrian female artistic gymnasts
Gymnasts at the 1948 Summer Olympics
Olympic gymnasts of Austria
20th-century Austrian women